The island of Taiwan, which is located in southeast Asia at the junction of the East China Sea and South China Seas, is home to 30 endemic bird species.

Endemic Bird Areas
Birdlife International defines Endemic Bird Areas (EBAs) as places where the breeding ranges of two or more range-restricted species—those with breeding ranges of less than —overlap. In order to qualify, the whole of the breeding range of at least two range-restricted species must fall entirely within the EBA. The entire island of Taiwan has been designated as an Endemic Bird Area.

In addition, Orchid Island (Lán Yǔ),  km off the south-east coast of Taiwan has been designated as a secondary area, as two restricted-range species (Taiwan green pigeon and elegant scops owl) occur there.

List of species

Notes

Citations

References

External links
 Birding in Taiwan website of the Taiwan International Birding Association

Taiwan 

Endemic birds
Taiwan